Like a Rock is the thirteenth studio album by American singer-songwriter Bob Seger, released in 1986. The title track is best known for being featured in Chevrolet truck commercials throughout the 1990s and early 2000s.

Content
"Fortunate Son" is a live cover of the 1969 Creedence Clearwater Revival hit, recorded March 31, 1983 at Cobo Hall in Detroit. It was originally available only as the B-side of the "American Storm" single, and was added as a bonus track to the CD release of the album. The vinyl version ends with "Somewhere Tonight". The song "Miami" is featured in an episode of the TV series Miami Vice. 

Seger said of "The Ring":

Cash Box said of "It's You" that "This mid-tempo ballad has a mellow country inflection with the customary Seger rock edge."  Billboard called it a "subdued mid-tempo song" that "fairly begs for a country cover." 

Cash Box called "Miami" a "more relaxed, meldodic outing."  Billboard called it a "wistful boogie [that] contemplates the immigrant's dilemma." 

This is the first studio album credited to "Bob Seger & the Silver Bullet Band" that doesn't feature the Muscle Shoals Rhythm Section replacing the Silver Bullet Band on any tracks.

History
The album was originally going to be named American Storm after the first track and was going to be released in December 1985, but it was delayed and the name was changed.

Track listing

Personnel
As listed in the liner notes.

Bob Seger – guitar (1), piano (3), acoustic guitar (4), vocals (all tracks)

Silver Bullet Band
Craig Frost – organ (1–4, 7), piano (4, 10), synthesizer (5, 6, 8, 9)
Chris Campbell – bass (all tracks)
Alto Reed – baritone saxophone (1, 7), tenor saxophone (3, 6), organ (10)

Additional musicians
Guitars
Pete Carr – guitar (1)
Dawayne Bailey – acoustic guitar (2), electric guitar (10)
Rick Vito – slide guitar (2, 5, 6), acoustic guitar (3, 4)
Fred Tackett – acoustic guitar (4, 9), guitar solo (7) 
Dann Huff – guitar (7)
Mark Chatfield – electric guitar (10)
Drums & Percussion
Russ Kunkel – drums (1, 2)
John Robinson – drums (3, 5–9)
Gary Mallaber – drums (4)
Don Brewer – drums (10)
Paulinho da Costa – percussion (3, 6, 8)
Keyboards
Bill Payne – piano (1, 2, 6–9), piano solo (8), synthesizer (3, 4, 8)
David Cole – synthesizer solo (8)
Horns
Gary Grant – trumpet (3)
Gary Herbig – saxophone (3)
Jerry Hey – trumpet (3, 6, 7)
Kim Hutchcroft – saxophone (3, 7)
Bill Reichenbach Jr. – trombone (3, 6, 7)
Marc Russo – saxophone (3, 6, 7)
Ernie Watts – saxophone (3, 6, 7)
Additional vocals
Douglas Kibble – background vocals (2)
The Weather Girls (Izora Armstead and Martha Wash) – background vocals (2, 5, 6)
Don Henley – background vocals (3)
Timothy B. Schmit – background vocals (3)
Laura Creamer – background vocals (5, 6, 8, 9)
Mark Creamer – background vocals (5, 6, 8, 9)
Donny Gerrard – background vocals (5, 6, 8, 9)
Shaun Murphy – vocals (5), background vocals (6, 9), harmony vocals (7, 8)

Production
Producers: Punch Andrews, David N. Cole, Bob Seger
Engineers: David N. Cole, Greg Edward, Shelly Yakus
Assistant engineers: David Axelbaum, Bob Castle, Judy Clapp, Peter Doell, Steve Himelfarb
Mixing: Punch Andrews, David N. Cole, Bob Seger
Mastering: Wally Traugott
Horn arrangements: Jerry Hey, Alto Reed
Art direction: Bill Burks, Roy Kohara
Design: Mark Shoolery
Photography: Aaron Rapoport

Charts
Album

Singles and tracks

References

Bob Seger albums
1986 albums
Albums produced by Punch Andrews
Albums produced by David N. Cole
Capitol Records albums
Albums recorded at Capitol Studios